A list of films produced in France in 2013.

References

External links
 2013 in France
 2013 in French television
 French films of 2013 at the Internet Movie Database
French films of 2013 at Cinema-francais.fr
 List of 2013 box office number-one films in France

French
2012
Films